Reginald D. Bennett (born 18 August 1937) is a British former tennis player.

Bennett, raised in the town of Bexhill-on-Sea in Sussex, won the singles title at both the Scottish Championships and South of England Championships in 1957. He played collegiate tennis in the United States for Lamar Tech and was the 1959 NAIA singles champion. One of his career best wins came over American top 10 player Gil Shea in Manchester and he beat Gene Scott in the first round of the 1961 Wimbledon Championships.

References

External links
 
 
 

1937 births
Living people
British male tennis players
Tennis people from East Sussex
Lamar Cardinals and Lady Cardinals athletes
College men's tennis players in the United States
People from Bexhill-on-Sea